, taglined Cats Paradise, is a series of adult visual novels developed by NEKO WORKs and published by Sekai Project. The first game in the series, Nekopara Vol. 1, was released in December 2014. Taking place in a world where humans live alongside adorable catgirls, the series follows Kashou Minaduki and Shigure Minaduki, siblings who have a family of catgirls named Chocola, Vanilla, Coconut, Azuki, Maple, Cinnamon and Cacao. It is centered around work life at Kashou's pâtisserie and home life at Shigure's family house.

An all-ages anime OVA adaptation was released on Steam in December 2017; it became one of the top earners in Steam in December 2017.

An anime television series adaptation by Felix Film premiered from January to March 2020. The anime is licensed in the United States, Canada, United Kingdom, Ireland, Australia, New Zealand, Mexico, Brazil, Chile, Peru and Colombia by Funimation.NEKO WORKs announced on November 29, 2021 that a new title for the series, After La Vraie Famille was in development.

Gameplay
Nekopara is a visual novel series, so the majority of the gameplay consists of the player reading the game's story. Nekopara does not offer choices to the player throughout gameplay, and the player has no influence over the story. The games are fully voiced (except for the protagonist) and utilize a system called "E-mote" that allows the in-game characters to be animated, instead of stationary sprites. Nekopara Vol. 0 added a new feature where the player can click on characters in-game, to "pet" them. The characters will react in different ways depending on where the player pets them.

Plot

Vol. 0
This prequel to Vol. 1 provides a look at a day in the life of Shigure and the six catgirls in the family house. There is little to no involvement of the previous protagonist Kashou Minaduki.

Vol. 1
Kashou Minaduki is an aspiring chef who moves away from home to open his own confection shop. While he is unpacking in his new shop, he discovers that two of his family catgirls, Chocola and Vanilla, came along with him by hiding in cardboard boxes. After the two catgirls convince Kashou to let them stay and live with him, the three of them work together to run his shop, La Soleil. During the story, Kashou receives a couple of visits from his younger sister Shigure and the other four catgirls owned by their family.

Vol. 2
Shigure and the other four catgirls, Maple, Cinnamon, Coconut and Azuki, begin working at La Soleil. This part focuses primarily on the contentious relationship between Coconut and Azuki, who struggle to find their place at the shop.

Vol. 3
The story of La Soleil continues. This part focuses primarily on the strong relationship between Maple and Cinnamon, as Maple tries to make a dream come true.

Vol. 4
La Soleil and the Minaduki family prepare to enter the Christmas season. This part focuses primarily on Kashou and figuring out what baking truly means to him so he can do his mentor proud and earn the approval of his father.

Extra
Taking place six months before Vol 1, this part focuses on the Minaduki household back when Chocola and Vanilla were kittens struggling to adapt to the family.

Characters

 Kashou is the protagonist of most of the visual novel games in the series. Kashou comes from a family with a long line of chefs, and decides to move away from home and open his own pâtisserie (pastry shop) despite his parents' wishes. It is revealed that Kashou studied abroad in France and sought to honor his mentor by focusing his baking talents towards Western-style confections, naming his pâtisserie La Soleil after his mentor's own pâtisserie.

Kashou's younger sister. She appears to have romantic feelings for Kashou in an incestuous way. She and her older brother are the owners of the Minaduki family catgirls.

Chocola is a cheerful and energetic brown-haired catgirls; she is often described as "happy go lucky" and always describes herself in the third person. She is Vanilla's twin sister and moved in with Kashou after he started his own business.

 Vanilla is a calm and quiet white-haired catgirl. She rarely expresses her emotions, making her a somewhat of a kūdere character. She loves her twin sister Chocola, and often follows her anywhere she goes. She and Chocola are the youngest of the Minaduki family catgirls throughout most of the series.

 Coconut is the third youngest of the Minaduki family catgirls. Other characters praise her for her "cool" personality, but she wishes she were cute rather than cool. She suffers from low self-esteem because of her klutziness and self-proclaimed lack of skills. She also tries to do more than she can to seem more like an older sister, as well as to not seem to burden Kashou and the other catgirls. She has heterochromia, with her right eye being yellow and left eye being blue. She is a Maine Coon.

 Azuki is the oldest of the Minaduki family catgirls. Despite being the oldest, she is also the shortest and has a mischievous personality. However, she lives up to being the eldest catgirl by effortlessly managing and leading her sisters as they work in Kashou's pâtisserie. She also has a tsundere personality, acting sarcastic and tough to hide her real emotions towards everyone. She is a Munchkin cat.

 Maple is the second oldest of the Minaduki family catgirls. She has an independent/mature personality, as well as a hint of tsundere given that she is typically dishonest with herself. She enjoying visiting cafes to try different food and drinks. She aspires to be a singer but is held back by her own lack of self-confidence as well as the prospect that she will only ever make it big because she is a catgirl. She is an American Curl.

 Cinnamon is the third oldest of the Minaduki family catgirls. She frequently interprets things in a sexual manner and ends up becoming aroused. She has purple hair, and she has the largest bust size of all the catgirls. She is closest to Maple and thus aspires to be by her side to support her life decisions. She is a Scottish Fold.

 Cacao is the youngest of the Minaduki family catgirls. She is a character who debuted in the animated series. She has mint green hair and always wears a hat. She was formerly a homeless catgirl before being brought into the Minaduki household by Chocola.

Release history

Nekopara Vol. 1, was released in two versions: an uncensored adult version that includes explicit sex scenes and nudity, and a censored all ages version where the explicit content is removed. Volume 1 received a release date of December 30, 2014.  An all ages fan disc titled Nekopara Vol. 0 was released on August 17, 2015.  Nekopara Vol. 2 was released on February 20, 2016. Nekopara Vol. 3 was originally scheduled to release on April 28, 2017, but it ended up being delayed to May 26, 2017. Shortly after Volume 3 was released, NEKO WORKs announced that Volume 4 was "coming soon". It was later revealed that Volume 4: Neko to Patisserie no Noel was scheduled for November 27, 2020.

Nekopara was ported and released on PlayStation 4 and Nintendo Switch in 2018.

A spin-off game, NEKOPALIVE, was released on Steam on June 1, 2016.

A mini visual novel based on the childhood of Chocola and Vanilla and the other Minaduki catgirls was confirmed to be produced after reaching the $800 000 stretch goal on the Nekopara OVA Kickstarter. It was later announced that the title would be Nekopara Extra, and was released on July 27, 2018.

It was revealed in November 2021, that a new volume called After La Vraie Famille was in development.

Sales
As of May 2016, the Nekopara series had sold over 500,000 copies. By April 2017, that number had doubled, surpassing one million copies.  One year later, in April 2018, the series had sold over 2 million copies. , the series has sold 3 million copies on Steam. NEKO WORKs announced on November 29, 2021 that franchise sales have exceeded 5 million.

Reception
Hardcore Gamer gave Nekopara Vol. 1 a positive review, stating that " Nekopara is a light and fluffy visual novel that fans of catgirls will enjoy," but noted that "some may be put off by the sexual storyline aspect."

In May 2021, Nekopara was one of five isekai-oriented anime titles (along with KonoSuba, That Time I Got Reincarnated as a Slime, Princess Lover!, and Zombie Land Saga) that were given a limited ban by the Russian government for their depiction of reincarnation.

Adaptations

Anime

OVA
In July 2016, Sekai Project announced that it would be running a Kickstarter campaign to fund an all-ages Nekopara original video animation adaptation.  The campaign launched in December 2016, and reached its US$100,000 funding goal "mere hours" after launching. The campaign ended on Kickstarter on February 11, 2017, and raised US$963,376 from 9,322 backers, however, was extended in order to reach the final stretch goal. In March 2017, the campaign formally ended on Sekai Project's "slacker backer" service, and raised a total of US$1,049,552. On December 4, 2017, Sekai Project announced that the OVA would be released on December 26, 2017, however, was later moved to December 22, 2017 due to a shipping error by Tokyo Otaku Mode, the company responsible for physical goods.

The opening theme for the OVA is "Baby→Lady LOVE" by Ray, while the ending theme is "▲MEW▲△MEW△CAKE" by Kotoko.

A second OVA, based on the Nekopara Extra visual novel, was released alongside the visual novel on July 27, 2018. The ending theme for Nekopara Extra is Symphony by Luce Twinkle Wink☆.

Television anime
During the Comiket 95 event, it was announced that an anime television series adaptation was in production. The series is animated by Felix Film and directed by Yasutaka Yamamoto, with Gō Zappa handling series composition, Yuichi Hirano designing the characters, and Akiyuki Tateyama composing the music. The first episode of the television anime premiered at Anime Expo 2019 on July 6, 2019, and the first two episodes aired at a special event in Tokyo on December 24, 2019. The series premiered on January 9, 2020 through March 26, 2020 on AT-X, Tokyo MX, and BS11. The series has aired for 12 episodes. Funimation acquired the series for distribution in North America, the British Isles, and Australasia, streaming the series on FunimationNow, Wakanim and AnimeLab, and produced an English dub for the series. The series simulcasts in Southeast Asia on Aniplus Asia. The series released to Blu-Ray by Funimation on May 18, 2021.

Manga
A manga adaptation illustrated by Tam-U is currently being published in Dengeki G's Comic magazine. The manga began serialisation in the July issue of Dengeki G's Comic on May 30, 2018. During Anime Expo 2018, Sekai Project announced that they would release the manga in English digitally, with the first chapter scheduled for release in August 2018.

Mobile games
In 2019, a mobile game adaptation of the series, Nekoparaiten!, was announced; its release was planned to take place in 2020. Its creators described Nekoparaiten! as a "romance simulation" game.

Notes

References

External links
  
  
  
 
 Nekopara on Steam
 
 
 
 

2014 video games
2020 anime television series debuts
ASCII Media Works manga
Crunchyroll anime
Felix Film
Manga based on video games
Nintendo Switch games
PlayStation 4 games
Seinen manga
Video games developed in Japan
Visual novels
Windows games
Works banned in Russia